Sazak may refer to:

People
 Sazak (surname), list of people with the surname

Places
Sazak, Beyağaç
Sazak, Çal
Sazak, Çorum
Sazak, Ilgaz
Sazak, Kızılcahamam, a village in Kızılcahamam district of Ankara Province, Turkey
Sazak, Mihalıçcık, a village in Mihalıçcık district of Eskişehir Province, Turkey
Sazak, Sarayköy
Sazak, Yeşilova
Sazak, Yenice

Others
Sazak assault, an ambush carried out in 1997 on soldiers, in the Sazak neighbourhood of Reşadiye district of Tokat Province, Turkey